The 1930 United States House of Representatives elections in South Carolina were held on November 4, 1930 to select seven Representatives for two-year terms from the state of South Carolina.  All seven incumbents were re-elected and the composition of the state delegation remained solely Democratic.

1st congressional district
Incumbent Democratic Congressman Thomas S. McMillan of the 1st congressional district, in office since 1925, was unopposed in his bid for re-election.

General election results

|-
| 
| colspan=5 |Democratic hold
|-

2nd congressional district
Incumbent Democratic Congressman Butler B. Hare of the 2nd congressional district, in office since 1925, won the Democratic primary and was unopposed in the general election.

Democratic primary

General election results

|-
| 
| colspan=5 |Democratic hold
|-

3rd congressional district
Incumbent Democratic Congressman Frederick H. Dominick of the 3rd congressional district, in office since 1917, was unopposed in his bid for re-election.

General election results

|-
| 
| colspan=5 |Democratic hold
|-

4th congressional district
Incumbent Democratic Congressman John J. McSwain of the 4th congressional district, in office since 1921, was unopposed in his bid for re-election.

General election results

|-
| 
| colspan=5 |Democratic hold
|-

5th congressional district
Incumbent Democratic Congressman William F. Stevenson of the 5th congressional district, in office since 1917, defeated Zeb V. Davidson in the Democratic primary for the third straight time and was unopposed in the general election.

Democratic primary

General election results

|-
| 
| colspan=5 |Democratic hold
|-

6th congressional district
Incumbent Democratic Congressman Allard H. Gasque of the 6th congressional district, in office since 1923, was unopposed in his bid for re-election.

General election results

|-
| 
| colspan=5 |Democratic hold
|-

7th congressional district
Incumbent Democratic Congressman Hampton P. Fulmer of the 7th congressional district, in office since 1921, defeated D.R. Sturkie in the Democratic primary and was unopposed in the general election.

Democratic primary

General election results

|-
| 
| colspan=5 |Democratic hold
|-

See also
United States House of Representatives elections, 1930
South Carolina gubernatorial election, 1930
South Carolina's congressional districts

References

"Supplemental Report of the Secretary of State to the General Assembly of South Carolina." Reports of State Officers Boards and Committees to the General Assembly of the State of South Carolina. Volume I. Columbia, SC: 1931, pp. 4–7.

South Carolina
1930
1930 South Carolina elections